Kim Su-jeong (born 14 June 1974) is a South Korean former field hockey player. She competed in the women's tournament at the 2000 Summer Olympics.

References

External links
 

1974 births
Living people
South Korean female field hockey players
Olympic field hockey players of South Korea
Field hockey players at the 2000 Summer Olympics
Place of birth missing (living people)
Asian Games medalists in field hockey
Asian Games gold medalists for South Korea
Medalists at the 1994 Asian Games
Medalists at the 1998 Asian Games
Field hockey players at the 1994 Asian Games
Field hockey players at the 1998 Asian Games